The Swangla is a tribal community found in Lahaul and Spiti district of Himachal Pradesh, India. They are primarily settled in the pattan region of the Lahaul sub- division. As per Census of India, the population of Swangla Tribe stood at 9,630 (Males 4829 and females 4801).

Social status
, the Swangla were classified as a Scheduled Tribe under the Indian government's reservation program of positive discrimination.

References

Scheduled Tribes of Himachal Pradesh